Deakin may refer to:

Places 

Deakin University, Victoria, Australia

Deakin, Australian Capital Territory, suburb of Canberra, Australia
Deakin, Western Australia, siding on the Trans-Australian Railway
Division of Deakin, Australian Electoral Division in Victoria, Australia

People 

Deakin (surname), including a list of people with the surname
Deakin (musician) (born 1978), American musician, member of Animal Collective

Other 

Evans Deakin & Company, Australian shipbuilders
Alfred Deakin High School in the suburb Deakin, Canberra, Australia.

See also 

 Deakins
 Deacon
 Deacon (disambiguation)